The Azerbaijan Grand Prix is a Formula One motor racing event that was held for the first time in . It is held on the Baku City Circuit, a street circuit in Baku, the capital of Azerbaijan.

The event is due to take place at the Baku City Circuit until at least 2024.

History
The first Formula One Grand Prix to be held in Azerbaijan was the 2016 European Grand Prix, which took place at the Baku City Circuit. A year later, in 2017, the same venue hosted the first Azerbaijan Grand Prix. The race was held on 25 June and was one of five races to be held on a street circuit during the 2017 Formula One season, along with the Singapore, Monaco, Australian and Canadian Grands Prix. The first Azerbaijan Grand Prix winner was Daniel Ricciardo of Red Bull.

The 2018 Azerbaijan Grand Prix took place on 29 April as the 4th round of the season and was won by Lewis Hamilton.

The 2019 Azerbaijan Grand Prix was held on 28 April as the 4th round of the season. In March 2020, the 2020 race was postponed due to the COVID-19 pandemic, before being cancelled later in the year. The 2021 Azerbaijan Grand Prix featured as the 6th round of the season.

No Formula One driver has ever won in Baku twice so far, although the race was won twice by Mercedes (2018 and 2019) and three times by Red Bull Racing (2017, 2021 and 2022).

Winners

Repeat winners (constructors)
Teams in bold are competing in the Formula One championship in the current season.

Repeat winners (engine manufacturers)
Manufacturers in bold are competing in the Formula One championship in the current season.

By year

Notes

References

 
Formula One Grands Prix
National Grands Prix
Auto races in Azerbaijan
Sports competitions in Baku
2017 establishments in Azerbaijan
Recurring sporting events established in 2017